Dessau is a town and former municipality in Germany at the confluence of the rivers Mulde and Elbe, in the Bundesland (Federal State) of Saxony-Anhalt. Since 1 July 2007, it has been part of the newly created municipality of Dessau-Roßlau. Population of Dessau proper: 67,747 (Dec. 2020).

Geography

Dessau is situated on a floodplain where the Mulde flows into the Elbe. This causes yearly floods. The worst flood took place in the year 2002, when the Waldersee district was nearly completely flooded. The south of Dessau touches a well-wooded area called Mosigkauer Heide. The highest elevation is a 110 m high former rubbish dump called Scherbelberg in the southwest of Dessau. Dessau is surrounded by numerous parks and palaces that make it one of the greenest towns in Germany.

History

Dessau was first mentioned in 1213. It became an important centre in 1570, when the Principality of Anhalt was founded. Dessau became the capital of this state within the Holy Roman Empire. In 1603, the state was split into four – later five – Anhalts, Dessau  becoming the capital of the mini-state of Anhalt-Dessau. In 1863 two of the noble lines died out, and the Duchy of Anhalt became reunited. From 1918 to 1945, Dessau was the capital of the Free State of Anhalt.

Dessau is famous as the second site of the Bauhaus school. It moved here in 1925 after it had been forced to close in Weimar. Many famous artists were lecturers in Dessau in the following years, among them Walter Gropius, Paul Klee and Wassily Kandinsky. The Nazis control of Dessau city council forced the closure of the Dessau Bauhaus in 1932. The school moved to Bernau bei Berlin and closed its doors for the last time in 1933.

The town was almost completely destroyed by Allied air raids in World War II on 7 March 1945, six weeks before American troops occupied the town. Afterwards, it was rebuilt with typical GDR concrete slab architecture (Plattenbau) and became a major industrial centre of East Germany. Since German reunification in 1990, many historic buildings have been restored.

The composer Kurt Weill was born in Dessau. Since 1993, the city has hosted an annual Kurt Weill Festival. Dessau was also the birthplace of the philosopher Moses Mendelssohn (in 1729), and Leopold I, Prince of Anhalt-Dessau (der alte Dessauer) (on 3 July 1676), a lauded field marshal for the Kingdom of Prussia.

In January 2005, Dessau gained notoriety for the mysterious death of a Sierra Leonean convicted drug trafficker and failed asylum seeker Oury Jalloh.

Sights

Castles and gardens

Garden Kingdom of Dessau-Wörlitz, (Dessau-Wörlitzer Gartenreich) is a World Heritage Site landscape garden. It is an exceptional example of 18th century Age of Enlightenment landscape design in the English style.
Dresden Elbe Valley
Zoo at Mausoleumspark
Wallwitzburg
Rondell
remains of the Dessau Palace (Johannbau)
Georgium Palace and Park
Kühnau Palace and Park
Mosigkau Palace and Park
Luisium Palace and Park
Erbprinzliches Palais Dessau (demolished)

The Bauhaus

There are several examples of Bauhaus architecture in Dessau, some of which are part of the Bauhaus and its Sites in Weimar, Dessau and Bernau World Heritage Site. This includes the Bauhaus Dessau school building, designed by Walter Gropius, which is one of the iconic modernist buildings of the 20th century.

In addition to the buildings that are part of the World Heritage Site, other notable Bauhaus architecture in Dessau includes:
 Dessau-Törten Estate, designed by Walter Gropius in 1926–1928.
Stahlhaus (Steel House), designed by Georg Muche and Richard Paulick in 1926–1927.
Fieger Haus,  designed by Carl Fieger in 1927.
 The Kornhaus, a restaurant overlooking the river Elbe designed by Carl Fieger in 1929–1930.
 Arbeitsamt (Employment office), designed by Walter Gropius in 1928–1929. It is now the Dessau-Roßlau Amt für Ordnung und Verkehr (Authority of Public Security and Regulations).

Churches

St. Mary's Church
St. John's Church
Georgenkirche
Petruskirche
Auferstehungskirche
Pauluskirche
Christuskirche
Propsteikirche St. Peter and Paul
Dreieinigkeit
St. Josef

Other sights

 Townhall, built in 1901
 The palaces of Waldersee and Dietrich, today used as libraries
 General post office
 New water tower
 Umweltbundesamt (formerly Wörlitzer Bahnhof)
 Footbridge crossing the river Mulde

Culture

Theatres and museums

 Anhaltisches Theater including Gregor Seyffert & Compagnie
 City history museum
 Anhalt Art Gallery at Georgium Palace with park (currently closed)
 Mosigkau Palace museum
 Luisium Castle museum with park
 Oranienbaum Palace museum with park
 Museum of Natural- and Prehistory
 Moses Mendelssohn-Centre
 Hugo Junkers Technical Museum
 UCI Cinema Complex
 Kiez-Cinema (one of the smallest Cinemas in Germany)

Regional media
 Mitteldeutsche Zeitung (daily newspaper, Monday-Saturday)
 Wochenspiegel (free newspaper on Wednesday) and Supersonntag (free newspaper on Sunday)
 REGJO (quarterly Economy Journal for the Region of Leipzig/Halle)
 leo (monthly, regional Event- and Culture Magazine)
 local Studios of the MDR and SAW (Radiostations)
 local TV Stations: RAN 1 and Offener Kanal Dessau

Transport

Public transport
The Dessau tramway network has three lines and is supplemented by numerous bus lines.

Railway stations

Dessau Hauptbahnhof (main station) has connections to Magdeburg, Berlin, Leipzig, Halle, Bitterfeld and Lutherstadt Wittenberg. The line from Berlin was opened on 1 September 1840. The Dessau-Bitterfeld line (opened on 17 August 1857) was electrified in 1911, the first fully electrified long-distance railway in Germany. Dessau was part of the InterCity long-distance network until the year 2002. Regional trains also stop at the stations Dessau-Süd, Dessau-Alten, Dessau-Mosigkau and Rodleben. The Dessau-Wörlitzer-Eisenbahn (railway) connects Dessau to Wörlitz, a town situated 15 km to the east, and the Wörlitzer Park. The starting point of this railway is the main station. This train also stops at the stations Dessau-Waldersee and Dessau-Adria.

Roads

In 1938 the autobahn A9 (Munich-Berlin) was built southeast of the town area. The two exits to Dessau on the A9 are called "Dessau-Ost" and "Dessau-Süd". Dessau is also crossed by the "Bundesstrassen" (federal roads) B 184 and B 185.

Airfield
The airfield of Dessau (ICAO: EDAD) is situated northwest of the town between the districts Kleinkühnau, Alten and Siedlung. A destination with a charter airplane is possible. The runway has a length of 1000 m. The Hugo Junkers Technical Museum is situated in the neighbourhood (directly east) of the airfield, which has the eastern end of the modern runway almost directly abutting the historical World War II Junkers factory airstrip's western end.

Water
Today the "Leopoldshafen" (harbour) is used for the annual international motorboat racing events. The "Wallwitzhafen" is used as a private sportboat harbour and the "Elbehafen" near the Grain House is used for cruisers.The next harbour for goods is situated in Rosslau.

Bikes
Dessau is located in the flat landscape of the Saxon Lowland. The bike roads have a length of about 146 km and connect all the parks and sights.

Sports
Sports like soccer, cycling, handball, volleyball, gymnastics, table tennis and tennis have a long tradition and are very popular in Dessau. The former soccer team "SG Waggonbau Dessau" won the GDR soccer cup in 1949. The handball team played in the GDR "Oberliga" and since 1990 they are playing in the 1st and 2nd "Bundesliga". Currently, Dessau has around 80 sport clubs with over 13,500 members. 
Next to the traditional sports, Dessau has active sport clubs in the following disciplines: aikido, badminton, basketball, canoeing, chess, climbing, cycling, dancing, fishing, horse riding, karate, judo, jiu-jitsu, motorboat, rowing, speedskating, sailing, skittles, skydiving, squash, swimming, table tennis, water polo, wrestling and others.

Facilities

 Numerous Sports Fields (more than 10)
 Skittle Alleys (6)
 Tennis Courts (3)
 Boathouses (3)
 Indoor Swimming Pools (2)
 Paul-Greifzu-Stadion (for 22,000 viewers)
 Speedskating Course
 Climbing Tower Zuckerturm
 Anhalt Arena Dessau (for 3,600 viewers)
 Airfield Dessau
 Rifle Range

Governance

The borough of Dessau was first mentioned in 1372. The head of the town called "Schultheiss" was constituted by the count. Together with a few assessors the "Schultheiss" formed the town council. As of 1372 the town council was divided into two agencies, as of 1600 into three agencies and as of 1785 again into two agencies. The "Schultheiss" of Dessau changed nearly every year until the town council constitution was cancelled in 1832. Afterwards Dessau became a Town Council and a Town Delegation Constitution. Since 1852 the town leader is called Mayor. During the National Socialist period the Mayor was appointed by the party (NSDAP). After World War II  the Soviets formed an executive council with a Mayor. The town council constitution was elected by the people. Since German reunification this committee is freely elected. Since 1994 it has been called "Stadtrat". Since 1994, the Mayor is directly elected by the people.

In 2007, Dessau became part of the municipality Dessau-Roßlau.

Mayor
Peter Kuras (born 1958) was elected mayor of Dessau-Roßlau in June 2014 with 75.82% of the votes for a term of seven years. He is the successor of Klemens Koschig (born 1957, independent), who was elected in 2007 with 56.8% of the votes.

Town Council (Stadtrat)
Consists of the following parties: (Local Elections from 25 May 2014)
 CDU (14 seats),
 The Left (11 seats)
 The Greens (3 seats)
 SPD (7 seats)
 Pro Dessau (5 seats)
 AfD (3 seats)
 FDP (2 seats)
 Neues Forum: (2 seats)
 Bürgerliste (2 seats)
 NPD 1 seat

Town twinning 
Dessau is twinned with:

Education
 Anhalt University of Applied Sciences (Architecture, Facility Management, Design and Geoinformatics)
 Learning Centre from the German Chamber of Industry and Commerce (Halle/ Dessau)
 Anhalt Vocational School Centre Hugo Junkers I, II and III (Chapon-School)
 Grammar School "Walter Gropius"
 Grammar School "Liborius"
 Grammar School "Philantropinum"

European subsidies 
Dessau is part of the EU-URBAN programme. This programme is based on the integrated approach that is used for tackling the environmental, economical and social problems, affecting the deprived urban areas. There are several projects in Dessau sponsored via this subsidy.

Notable people

Academics
Peter Lebrecht Schmidt (1933–2019), German classical scholar

Aristocracy
 George III, Prince of Anhalt-Dessau (1507–1553), prince
 Bernhard VII, Prince of Anhalt-Zerbst (1540–1570), prince
 John Casimir, Prince of Anhalt-Dessau (1596–1660), prince
 John George II, Prince of Anhalt-Dessau (1627–1693), prince and Prussian field marshal
 Leopold I, Prince of Anhalt-Dessau (1676–1747), ruler of Anhalt-Dessau from 1693 to 1747
 Leopold II, Prince of Anhalt-Dessau (1700–1751), prince and Prussian general
 Dietrich of Anhalt-Dessau (1702–1769), prince and Prussian field marshal
 Princess Adelheid-Marie of Anhalt-Dessau (1833–1916), Duchess of Nassau and Grand Duchess of Luxembourg
 Eduard, Duke of Anhalt (1861–1918), Prince of the House of Ascania and the penultimate ruler of the Duchy of Anhalt in 1918
 Joachim Ernst, Duke of Anhalt (1901–1947), the last ruler of the Duchy of Anhalt

Science and philosophy
 Moses Mendelssohn (1729–1786), German Jewish philosopher, father of Haskalah
 Heinrich Schwabe (1789–1875), astronomer and botanist, worked on sunspots
 Karl Adolph von Basedow (1799–1854), a German physician
 Max Müller (1823–1900), philologist and Orientalist
 Franz Woepcke (1826–1864), an historian, Orientalist and mathematician
 Friedrich Preisigke (1856–1924), a German Egyptologist and papyrologist
 Hugo Junkers (1859–1935), German engineer and airplane designer, constructed first airplane made from metal, founded the Junkers & Co
 Gustav Lindau (1866–1923), mycologist and botanist 
 Johannes Winkler (1897–1947), launched the first liquid-fuelled rocket in Europe at Dessau
 Hans von Ohain (1911–1998), physicist, designer of the first jet engine
 Gernot Böhme (1937–2022), philosopher and author

The arts
 Wilhelm Karl Rust (1787–1855), a German pianist
 Friedrich von Olivier (1791–1859), a German history painter in the Romantic style
 Wilhelm Müller (1794–1827), lyric poet, best known for the Lieder of Franz Schubert
 Ludwig Philippson (1811–1889), writer and rabbi, founder of Allgemeine Zeitung des Judentums
 Wilhelm Rust (1822–1892), composer, musicologist, Bach researcher and choirmaster
 Bernhard Cossmann (1822–1910), a German cellist
 Friedrich Grützmacher (1832–1903), cellist and composer
 Leopold Grützmacher (1835-1900), a German cellist and composer. 
 Erna Schorlemmer (1875-1945), a German composer 
 Julius Schubring (1839–1914), classical scholar
 Henriette Johanne Marie Müller (1841–1916), a street character identified with Hamburg
 August Klughardt (1847–1902), composer and conductor
 Kurt Weill (1900–1950), composer, grew up in Dessau, worked with Bertolt Brecht, 
 Gerhard Nebel (1903–1974), writer, essayist and cultural critic
 Ursula Herking (1912–1974), actress and cabaret artist
 Anne-Marie Lauenstein (1923–2010), first German war bride to emigrate to the US in 1946
 Herbert Tobias (1924–1982), fashion photographer
 Horst Bollmann (1925–2014), a German film and television actor
 Gerhard Stolze (1926–1979), a German operatic tenor
 Karl-Heinz Kämmerling (1930–2012), professor of piano
 Brigitte Grothum (born 1935), a German film actress
 Dieter Hallervorden (born 1935), comedian, cabaret artist and singer, hon. citizen of Dessau
 Imi Knoebel (born 1940), a German artist of minimalist, abstract painting and sculpture
 Emil Schult (born 1946), painter, poet and musician
 Thomas Kretschmann (born 1962), actor
 Annette Schlünz (born 1964), a German musician and composer
 Michael Flade (born 1975), German composer of electronic music

Sports
 Ameli Koloska (born 1944), javelin thrower, competed in the 1968 Summer Olympics
 Danny Fuchs (born 1976), retired Bundesliga football player
 Carsten Rump (born 1981), a retired German footballer with 436 club caps

Gallery

References

External links

 
Official Website of Dessau (English and German)

 
Populated places disestablished in 2007
Former municipalities in Saxony-Anhalt
Historic Jewish communities
Duchy of Anhalt
Populated riverside places in Germany
Populated places on the Elbe